Dirachma is the sole genus of the family Dirachmaceae. The genus had been monotypic, its sole species being the woody plant Dirachma socotrana, until a second, herbaceous, species, Dirachma somalensis, was discovered in Somalia and described in 1991.

References

Rosales
Rosales genera
Taxa named by Isaac Bayley Balfour
Taxa named by Georg August Schweinfurth
Flora of Somalia
Flora of Socotra